Marcella is the debut studio album by British-based American musician Marcy Levy, who in her later career would perform under the name Marcella Detroit.

Background 
Detroit aka Levy began working on her debut solo album with producer David Foster in the mid-1970s signed to RSO Records, whilst she was touring with Eric Clapton. The album was primarily an R&B-oriented record, which Detroit felt was an attempt to "pigeonhole" her by RSO Records. For unknown reasons, the album was not finished. Detroit later stopped touring with Clapton to focus more on her own solo career. Whilst working on singing and songwriting for numerous artists including Burt Bacharach, Carole Bayer Sager,  Chaka Khan, Belinda Carlisle, and Al Jarreau, she was also working on her own solo album, and Marcella was finally released in 1982 and failed to appear on any major charts. After the commercial failure of the album, Epic Records refused her tour allowance with John Mellencamp, and she was later dropped by the label.

The song "Love Side" was covered by Rita Coolidge on her 1984 album Inside the Fire with the title "Hit Me on the Loveside".

Track listing 
All tracks composed by Marcella Levy and Richard Feldman; except where noted.

References 

1982 debut albums
Marcella Detroit albums
Albums produced by John Boylan (record producer)
Epic Records albums